The following highways are numbered 912:

Costa Rica
 National Route 912

United States